Gabonese literature, like many African literatures, began as an oral tradition.

Colonial writing 
Many American and European, especially French, writers penned works on Gabon. Père Trilles is one of the main writers of these texts with Mille lieu's dans l'inconnu: de la côte aux rives du Djah (A Thousand Leagues Into the Unknown: From the Coast to the Banks of the Djah).

References